Craig Lawrence Kilborn (born August 24, 1962) is an American comedian, sports and political commentator, actor, and television host. Kilborn began a career in sports broadcasting in the late 1980s, leading to an anchoring position at ESPN's SportsCenter from 1993 to 1996. He was later the first host of The Daily Show, which he hosted from 1996 to 1998, and succeeded Tom Snyder on CBS' The Late Late Show from 1999 to 2004. In 2010, he launched The Kilborn File after a six-year absence from television, which aired on some Fox stations for a six-week trial run. In comedy, Kilborn is known for his deadpan delivery.

Early life
Craig Kilborn was born in Kansas City, the son of Shirley, a schoolteacher, and Hiram Kilborn, an insurance executive. When he was four years old, he and his family moved to Hastings, Minnesota, where he was raised. In the ninth grade, Kilborn was recruited by the Northside Magicians, an all-star basketball team in Minneapolis, Minnesota. He excelled with the Magicians and with the Hastings High School basketball team, ultimately earning three letters and multiple all-conference and all-state honors.

After graduating high school, Kilborn accepted a scholarship to play for Montana State University, where he earned dual bachelor's degrees in media and theater arts in 1985 and has joked he "led the Big Sky Conference in turnovers" and also bench pressed  while training.

Career

Media
Kilborn began in radio, as the CBA Savannah Spirits's play-by-play radio commentator in 1986 and 1987. He later began his television career in California as the sports anchor for Monterey County's Fox affiliate KCBA in Salinas. Some of his early on-air work included covering the Gilroy Garlic Festival and playing bocce with the locals near Cannery Row. Kilborn lived in nearby Carmel-by-the-Sea.

SportsCenter

After several small jobs, Kilborn became an ESPN SportsCenter anchor from 1993 to 1996. He was primarily the anchor of the late broadcast of SportsCenter which he coined "The Feel Good Edition". His numerous catch phrases included "Release, Rotation, Splash", "Jumanji", and "Oh, Precious". He made a return appearance to SportsCenter on August 8, 2004, when he co-hosted SportsCenter with Dan Patrick during ESPN's 25th Anniversary Celebration.

Late-night hosting

The Daily Show

In 1996, Kilborn became host of The Daily Show on Comedy Central. During his three-year tenure, The Daily Show was named "Best Late Night Comedy" by TV Guide. Kilborn was also nominated for a CableACE Award for Outstanding Entertainment Host. Some recurring features Kilborn created at The Daily Show included: "5 Questions", "Moment for Us", "Dance, Dance, Dance", and "Your Moment of Zen" (later hosts would continue to use the latter feature).

In a 1997 interview with Esquire, Kilborn made jokes regarding Daily Show creator and head writer Lizz Winstead, saying, "To be honest, Lizz does find me very attractive. If I wanted her to bl-- me, she would." Kilborn apologized publicly and pointed out that the remarks were "said in jest", but he was suspended for a week.

In 1998, CBS and David Letterman's production company, Worldwide Pants, selected Kilborn to replace Tom Snyder as host of The Late Late Show to run after Late Show with David Letterman.  His final Daily Show episode aired on December 17, 1998, ending a 386-episode tenure. On January 11, 1999, Jon Stewart replaced Kilborn as host of The Daily Show. By the time of Kilborn’s departure, only one original correspondent Beth Littleford, who departed in May 2000, stayed with Stewart

On Jon Stewart's last Daily Show episode August 6, 2015, Kilborn made a cameo appearance as "Host Emeritus". It was his first appearance on the show since he left as host.

In a 2020 interview with The Athletic, Kilborn reflected on his time on The Daily Show, stating that he "had a blast" doing the show and that he was "living in New York City, hosting a comedy show, and sipping martinis at the illustrious 21 Club." He also said he "wasn’t hired at Comedy Central to do a politics-heavy show, and he "would never do one — I have no interest." Kilborn credited The Daily Show for leading him to his dream job of hosting a traditional late night show. He also said, "The Daily Show was innocently set up in a different way — they didn’t hire the host first – so we inherited each other. Fortunately, most of the people were a good fit and supportive. But as much as I enjoyed it...I was always a short-timer. It wasn’t my show, and I wanted to do a network traditional hour format as opposed to a half-hour news parody."

The Late Late Show

Kilborn hosted The Late Late Show for five years, changing the format to appeal to a younger audience. On the show, he popularized segments such as "Yambo" and "5 Questions". He created several characters, including Sebastian, the Asexual Icon.  He also narrated his own introduction and would enter to the sound of the song "Play That Funky Music" at the beginning of his show.

In August 2004, Kilborn elected not to extend his contract. In a 2010 interview with the Los Angeles Times Kilborn said, "I didn't leave to do anything else, I left to leave. I achieved my career goals and it wasn't all it was cracked up to be," and adding that he believed the late night timeslot to be "crowded," and "the formats repetitive." Kilborn later stated in a 2019 interview with the Philadelphia Inquirer, "The main reason I left the Late Late Show was creatively I lost interest in late night comedy. The other reason was that the business side of that particular show was excessively flawed so I escaped the silliness," adding that he had "developed a specific, aristocratic comedic sensibility that didn’t mesh with late night."

In a 2009 interview with the Television Academy Foundation, World Wide Pants executive Peter Lassally indicated that Kilborn left the show "because he didn't get the raise he wanted." However, Kilborn stated in a 2004 interview with Daily Variety that "[The Late Late Show] was easily the greatest job I've had, and CBS was very generous in their offer to re-sign me."

Kilborn's last episode of The Late Late Show aired on August 27, 2004.  The Scottish-born American comedian Craig Ferguson took over the show on January 3, 2005."

The Kilborn File
Craig Kilborn returned to television on June 28, 2010 after six years off the air, when his new half-hour show The Kilborn File debuted on select Fox stations. The show aired for a six-week test run on a 7:00 pm time slot in most markets, but was not well received. Christine Lakin was his sidekick. The show brought back many of the hallmark segments from his time on The Daily Show and The Late Late Show, such as "5 Questions" and a segment similar to "Yambo" (with some minor rule changes and a name change to "Kilbo" and later to "Kilbyashi"). The show was not renewed.

Other work
In the movie Old School (2003), Kilborn played Mark, the philandering boyfriend of Ellen Pompeo's character. In the 2006 film The Benchwarmers, he played Jerry, the bully to Jon Heder, David Spade, and Rob Schneider's nerdy roles. In 2011, Kilborn played the villain in an episode of Chuck during its final season.

Kilborn guest hosted The Artie Lange Show on November 6–8, 2013.

He appeared in a TV commercial for Kraft Macaroni & Cheese in 2016.

Filmography

Film

Television

Bibliography
 The Daily Show's Five Questions from Comedy Central (Andrews McMeel Publishing, 1998)

Awards and nominations

References

External links

 

1962 births
20th-century American comedians
20th-century American male actors
20th-century American writers
21st-century American comedians
21st-century American male actors
American male comedians
American male film actors
American male television actors
American political commentators
American satirists
American social commentators
American television talk show hosts
American television writers
Basketball players from Minnesota
Basketball players from Kansas City, Missouri
Comedians from Minnesota
Comedians from Missouri
Criticism of journalism
Late night television talk show hosts
Living people
Male actors from Minnesota
Male actors from Missouri
American male television writers
Montana State Bobcats men's basketball players
Montana State University alumni
People from Hastings, Minnesota
People from Kansas City, Missouri
Sportspeople from Minnesota
Sportspeople from Kansas City, Missouri
Writers from Minnesota
Writers from Kansas City, Missouri
American men's basketball players